Muvattupuzha State assembly constituency is one of the 140 state legislative assembly constituencies in Kerala state in southern India.  It is also one of the 7 state legislative assembly constituencies included in the Idukki Lok Sabha constituency. As of the 2021 assembly elections, the current MLA is Mathew Kuzhalnadan of Indian National Congress.

Local self governed segments
Muvattupuzha Niyamasabha constituency is composed of the following local self-governed segments:

Members of Legislative Assembly 
The following list contains all members of Kerala legislative assembly who have represented the constituency:

Key

Election results 
Percentage change (±%) denotes the change in the number of votes from the immediate previous election.

Niyamasabha Election 2021
There were 1,91,116 registered voters in Muvattupuzha Constituency for the 2021 Kerala Niyama Sabha Election.

Niyamasabha Election 2016 
There were 1,77,939 registered voters in the constituency for the 2016 Kerala Niyamasabha Election.

Niyamasabha Election 2011 
There were 1,54,440 registered voters in the constituency for the 2011 election.

See also
 Muvattupuzha
 Ernakulam district
 List of constituencies of the Kerala Legislative Assembly
 2016 Kerala Legislative Assembly election

References 

Assembly constituencies of Kerala

State assembly constituencies in Ernakulam district